The School of Engineering at Rutgers University was founded in 1914 as the College of Engineering. It was originally a part of the Rutgers Scientific School, which was founded in 1864. The school has seven academic departments, with a combined undergraduate student enrollment of over 2,400 students. It offers over 25 academic and professional degree programs. These include several interdisciplinary programs, such as Environmental Engineering (formerly called bioenvironmental engineering or bioresource engineering) with the Department of Environmental Science, and the graduate program in mechanics.

Departments and programs 
The Rutgers School of Engineering is composed primarily of seven academic departments. All of the degree programs offered are certified by the Accreditation Board for Engineering and Technology.

In addition, the School also has undergraduate programs in applied sciences and in Environmental Engineering (formerly known as Bioenvironmental Engineering), and also a graduate program in mechanics. The joint SoE/SEBS environmental engineering program is separate from the SoE-only civil and environmental engineering program. Students who chose to pursue a degree in applied sciences also have to option to select a concentration in Packaging Engineering, Engineering Physics, Biomedical Science, or Premed.

Degrees offered 
The school offers the Bachelor of Science (B.S.), Master of Science (M.S.), and Doctor of Philosophy (Ph.D.) degrees. Graduate students are technically enrolled in the Graduate School-New Brunswick, and not directly in the School of Engineering. For this reason, all graduate degrees are awarded to a student by the Graduate School-New Brunswick on successful completion of one or more of the degree programs listed below.

The SoE also offers a five-year B.S./M.B.A. program in conjunction with the Rutgers Business School. Students who opt for this program are, however, required to meet certain GPA and GMAT score requirements, and are required to apply to the program in the Spring semester of their Junior year.

A combined M.S. and diploma course is also offered by the School of Engineering and the von Karman Institute for Fluid Dynamics in Belgium.

The SoE is also home to the Rutgers-UMDNJ PhD Training Program in Biotechnology, which has received support from the National Institutes of Health for over 20 years.

Research centers 
The Rutgers School of Engineering is home to several research centers, and is also affiliated with other research centers throughout Rutgers University. These large-scale research centers are typically funded through various New Jersey and federal grants, and also through corporate sponsorships. Also, numerous smaller research laboratories exist within the various academic departments of the SoE.

An (incomplete) list of the research centers is provided below:
 Center for Innovative Ventures of Emerging Technologies
 Center for Advanced Infrastructure and Transportation (CAIT)
 Center for Advanced Energy Systems (CAES)
 Center for Advanced Materials via Immiscible Polymer Processing (AMIPP)
 Center for Digital Signal Processing Research
 Ceramic and Composite Materials Center (CCMC)
 Center for Nanomaterials Research
 Computationally Advanced Infrastructure Partnerships (CAIP) - previously known as the Center for Advanced Information Processing (CAIP)
 Fiber Optic Materials Research Program (FOMRP)
 Institute for Advanced Materials, Devices, and Nanotechnology (IAMDN)
 Laboratory for Nanostructured Materials Research
 Microelectronics Research Laboratory (MERL)
 Wireless Information Networks Laboratory (WINLAB)

Student organizations 
The School of Engineering has a student governing organization, the Engineering Governing Council (EGC). The EGC functions as a liaison between students and members of the faculty, distributes funds to the various engineering academic societies active within the SoE, and generally represents the students of the SoE in the Rutgers University Community.

Several national and international student and professional engineering organizations also have branches or chapters at the Rutgers School of Engineering, and listed below

 Alpha Eta Mu Beta - A biomedical engineering honor society
 American Institute of Aeronautics and Astronautics (AIAA)
 American Institute of Chemical Engineers
 American Society of Mechanical Engineers (ASME)
 American Society of Civil Engineers
 Biomedical Engineering Society
 Engineers Without Borders
 Eta Kappa Nu - A national electrical and computer engineering honor society
 Institute of Electrical and Electronics Engineers
 Institute of Industrial Engineers
 International Society for Pharmaceutical Engineering
 Material Advantage
 Minority Engineering Educational Task
 Phi Sigma Rho - A social sorority
 Research and Development at Rutgers (RADAR)
 Rutgers Engineering Pi Club
 Rutgers Formula Racing (Formula SAE)
 Society of Hispanic Engineers
 Sigma Phi Delta - An international social-professional engineering fraternity
 Society of Women Engineers
 Tau Beta Pi - A national engineering honor society

Notable alumni
Ann Marie Carlton, chemist and environmental engineer

References

External links 
 

Rutgers University colleges and schools
Engineering schools and colleges in the United States
Engineering universities and colleges in New Jersey
Educational institutions established in 1864
1864 establishments in New Jersey